Joseph William Nthiga Nyagah (6 January 1948 – 11 December 2020) was a Kenyan politician and Minister of Cooperative Development and Marketing in Kenya's grand coalition government.

Biography
Nyagah was a member of the then governing Kenya African National Union and a minister in President Daniel Arap Moi's office until quitting both the ministry and the party in the run-up to the 2002 general election. He fought the election in Gachoka Constituency as an opposition National Rainbow Coalition candidate.

He was a member of Orange Democratic Movement's 'Pentagon' in the lead up to the 2007 general election.

His LinkedIn profile refers to him as a "Cabinet Member at Government of Kenya".
He is brother to former Kamukunji Legislator Norman Nyaga and former Central Bank of Kenya governor, Nahashon Nyagah.

He died from COVID-19 during the COVID-19 pandemic in Kenya, twenty six days short from his 73rd birthday.

References

1948 births
2020 deaths
Orange Democratic Movement politicians
Government ministers of Kenya
Members of the National Assembly (Kenya)
Candidates for President of Kenya
Deaths from the COVID-19 pandemic in Kenya